Shuxin Avenue Station is a metro station at Chengdu, Sichuan, China. It is opened on December 18, 2020 with the opening of Chengdu Metro Line 6.

Station Overview 

Shu new Avenue station is located in Chengdu Pidu District, North and South Avenue and Wang Congzhong Road / West District Avenue intersection to the west about 100m, so the station is located in the West District Avenue and Shu new Avenue, Wang Congzhong Road intersection and named..Inaugurated on December 18, 2020.

References

Chengdu Metro stations
Railway stations in China opened in 2020